The Desbrosses Street Ferry was a ferry route across the Hudson River (then called the North River) in the 19th and 20th centuries. It provided passengers with ferry service between the Pennsylvania Railroad's Exchange Place station at Jersey City and Desbrosses Street in lower Manhattan where an elevated railway station at Ninth Avenue was located and where the Metropolitan Crosstown Line provided a connection to the Grand Street Ferry.

History
 
The Desbrosses Street Ferry opened in 1862 and ownership was transferred to the Pennsylvania Railroad in 1871. The ferry's route was longer, more circuitous and in a busier section of the river than most of the other ferries and as a result it suffered several accidents during its nearly 70 years in operation.

After the Pennsylvania Railroad became the first (and only) mainline railroad to build a tunnel under the Hudson River to Manhattan in 1910, the railroad gradually shifted its services away from its station in Jersey City in favor of its stations in Newark and Manhattan. On January 21, 1930 the ferry ceased operations and passengers were redirected to the railroad's other ferry services across the river.

See also
Pavonia Ferry
List of ferries across the Hudson River in New York City

References
 

1862 establishments in New Jersey
Transport companies established in 1862
Ferries of New Jersey
Ferries of New York City
Ferry companies of New Jersey
Ferry companies of New York City
Water transportation in New York City
Transportation in Hudson County, New Jersey